Chartres-de-Bretagne (Gallo: Chartr) is a commune in the Ille-et-Vilaine department of Brittany in northwestern France.

Inhabitants of Chartres-de-Bretagne are called Chartrains in French.

Population

See also
Communes of the Ille-et-Vilaine department
Emmanuel Guérin Sculptor Chartres-de-Bretagne war memorial

References

External links

 Official website 
 
Mayors of Ille-et-Vilaine Association 

Communes of Ille-et-Vilaine